Farnley may refer to:

England
 Farnley, Leeds, a district in Leeds, West Yorkshire, which includes Old Farley and New Farnley
 Farnley, North Yorkshire, a village and civil parish in the Harrogate district of North Yorkshire
 Farnley and Wortley (ward), an electoral ward of Leeds City Council in west Leeds, West Yorkshire
 Farnley Tyas, West Yorkshire

United States
 Farnley (White Post, Virginia), a property with two historic plantation houses

See also 
 Farley (disambiguation)
 Farnley Hall (disambiguation)